Kaplan may refer to:

Places
 Kapłań, Poland
 Kaplan, Louisiana, U.S.
 Kaplan Medical Center, a hospital in Rehovot, Israel
 Kaplan Street, in Tel Aviv, Israel
 Mount Kaplan, Antarctica
 Kaplan Arena, at the College of William & Mary in Williamsburg, Virginia

Other uses
 Kaplan (surname), including a list of people with the name
 Kaplan College, now Brightwood College, a system of for-profit colleges in the United States
 Kaplan Educational Foundation, a non-profit educational support entity
 Kaplan Foundation, dedicated to the music of Gustav Mahler
 Kaplan, Inc., a for-profit education company
 Kaplan Business School, a subsidiary of Kaplan located in Australia
 Kaplan Financial Education, a division of Kaplan, Inc.
 Kaplan International Languages, a division of Kaplan, Inc.
 Kaplan University, a former subsidiary of Kaplan, Inc., now known as Purdue University Global

 Kaplan turbine, a propeller-type water turbine
 William "Billy" Kaplan-Altman, known as "Wiccan," fictional comic book character

See also
 
 Caplan (disambiguation)
 Caplen (disambiguation)